The Vreeland Homestead is located in Nutley, Essex County, New Jersey, United States. The house was built in 1702 and added to the National Register of Historic Places on October 14, 1994.

The inscription on the tablet placed in 1935 by Nutley Chapter New Jersey Society, Sons of the American Revolution reads:

This building constructed about 1702, present home of Woman’s Club, was occupied during the Revolution by British sympathizers; confiscated for that reason, it was acquired by Captain Speer, Patriot soldier.

See also
Van Riper House
List of the oldest buildings in New Jersey
National Register of Historic Places listings in Essex County, New Jersey
Kingsland Manor

References

External links
Historic American Buildings Survey

Houses on the National Register of Historic Places in New Jersey
Houses in Essex County, New Jersey
Nutley, New Jersey
Stone houses in New Jersey
National Register of Historic Places in Essex County, New Jersey
New Jersey Register of Historic Places
1702 establishments in New Jersey